Nika Abuladze (born 20 August 1995) is a Georgian rugby union player. His position is prop, and he currently plays for the RC Kochebi of Georgian championship and the Georgia national team.

He has started in both Rugby Europe Super Cup finals for Black Lion, winning both. In 2023 he was signed by English Premiership side Exeter Chiefs until the 2024/25 season.

References

Rugby union players from Georgia (country)
1995 births
Living people
Rugby union props
Georgia international rugby union players
The Black Lion players